Aughafatten or Aghafatten is a small village and townland between Carnlough and Broughshane in County Antrim, Northern Ireland. It is in Mid and East Antrim District Council and part of the North Antrim constituency for local and European elections. It enjoys an excellent view of Slemish mountain.

Local services include an Orange Hall. The local accordion band Aughafatten Coronation Accordion Band take part in regular Orange Order parades. They take part in various parades across Northern Ireland and are affiliated to the Braid District of the Orange Order.

See also
List of villages in Northern Ireland

References

External links
Irishgenealogy.net

Villages in County Antrim